Hirokawa Bosai Dam is a rockfill dam located in Fukuoka Prefecture in Japan. The dam is used for flood control and irrigation. The catchment area of the dam is 9.4 km2. The dam impounds about 12  ha of land when full and can store 990 thousand cubic meters of water. The construction of the dam was completed in 1972.

References

Dams in Fukuoka Prefecture
1972 establishments in Japan